Weißenstadt is a town  in the district of Wunsiedel, in Upper Franconia, Bavaria, Germany. It is situated on the shore of the picturesque Weißenstadter See (Weissenstadt Lake), in the Fichtelgebirge Mountains, on the river Eger, 11 km northwest of Wunsiedel. The town got its name "White City" from the landmark church, once white now weathered dark grey.

Geography 
The town nestles in the valley of the Eger between the mountains of Waldstein and Rudolfstein and the pass of Höllpass on the plateau of the Fichtelgebirge.

Villages 
The borough of Weißenstadt incorporates the town itself and a number of villages:

Personalities

Sons and daughters of the city 
 Heinrich Schneider (1905-1985), writer
 Peter Beauvais (1916–1986), actor and director
 Horst Hüttel (* 1968), ski jumping trainer

Personalities who have worked on the ground 
 Erhard Ackermann (1813-1880), the founder of the industrial granite refinement in Germany

References

Wunsiedel (district)